Ingeborg Levin is a German professor in Geosciences at the Institute for Environmental Physics (IUP) of Heidelberg University. Her work with atmospheric measurements significantly contributed to the knowledge of greenhouse gas dynamics. She uses the concentration data of several chemical species to constrain carbon emissions and help validate global atmospheric models.

Biography 
Levin studied physics at Heidelberg University. She completed her doctoral thesis in 1978, on regional modeling of the atmospheric CO2 based on C-13 and C-14 measurements.

In 2020, she was the first woman to receive the Alfred Wegener medal from the European Geosciences Union.

She has been the group leader of the Carbon Cycle group in the Institute for Environmental Physics for more than 20 years, and a lecturer at the Faculty of Physics and Astronomy of Heidelberg University.

References 

German climatologists
Year of birth missing (living people)
Living people